Urocerus flavicornis, the yellow-horned horntail wasp, is a species of horntail native to North America.

References

Siricidae